Bute Dock Police was a small police force responsible for policing Bute Docks, in Cardiff, Wales. The force was formed in 1858 and was merged into the Great Western Railway Police in 1922.

See also
British Transport Police
Law enforcement in the United Kingdom
List of defunct law enforcement agencies in the United Kingdom

References

External links
Bute Docks Police badge

Defunct port police forces of the United Kingdom
History of Cardiff
Ports and harbours of Wales